

The De Bolotoff SDEB 14 was a British two-seat utility biplane designed by Prince Serge de Bolotoff and one example was built at his de Bolotoff Aeroplane Works at Sundridge Aerodrome,  Sundridge, near Sevenoaks, Kent. It was registered G-EAKC on 14 August 1919. The SDEB 14 was powered by a  Curtiss V-3 V-8 water-cooled piston engine, driving a tractor propeller.

Specifications

References

Notes

Bibliography

1910s British civil utility aircraft
Biplanes
Single-engined tractor aircraft